Lahoma is a town in Garfield County, Oklahoma, United States. The population was 611 at the 2010 census, a 5.9 percent gain over the figure of 577 in 2000. Its name was formed from the last three syllables of Oklahoma. Until the 1960s, Lahoma was a farm town. Later, it became primarily a bedroom community for people who commuted to work in Enid.

Geography
Lahoma is located at  (36.387928, -98.088752).

It lies in western Garfield County, 11 miles west of the county seat of Enid.

Demographics

As of the census of 2000, there were 577 people, 244 households, and 164 families residing in the town. There were 267 housing units at an average density of 877.6 per square mile (343.6/km2). The racial makeup of the town was 95.84% White, 0.69% African American, 1.21% Native American, 0.52% Asian, 0.35% from other races, and 1.39% from two or more races. Hispanic or Latino of any race were 3.47% of the population.

There were 244 households, out of which 30.3% had children under the age of 18 living with them, 49.6% were married couples living together, 15.2% had a female householder with no husband present, and 32.4% were non-families. 30.3% of all households were made up of individuals, and 10.2% had someone living alone who was 65 years of age or older. The average household size was 2.36 and the average family size was 2.94.

In the town, the population was spread out, with 24.4% under the age of 18, 10.2% from 18 to 24, 28.4% from 25 to 44, 24.3% from 45 to 64, and 12.7% who were 65 years of age or older. The median age was 37 years. For every 100 females, there were 84.9 males. For every 100 females age 18 and over, there were 84.0 males.

The median income for a household in the town was $30,227 and the median income for a family was $37,875. Males had a median income of $25,625 versus $18,462 for females. The per capita income for the town was $14,111. About 4.9% of families and 8.9% of the population were below the poverty line, including 6.5% of those under age 18 and 16.9% of those age 65 or over.

History 
Lahoma was founded in 1894 after the 1893 Cherokee Outlet land run.  The town was originally sited about one mile from its present location, but the town's buildings, businesses, and homes were moved to the current location in 1901 to be adjacent to a newly laid railroad line.

School 
 Cimarron Public Schools  is the area school district.

Churches
First Baptist Church
111 Lahoma Rd Lahoma, OK 73754

Zion Lutheran Church
502 Oklahoma Ave
Lahoma, OK 73754

United Church of Lahoma
P.O. Box 621
Lahoma, OK 73754

Notable people
 Nokie Edwards, lead guitarist for The Ventures

References

Towns in Garfield County, Oklahoma
Towns in Oklahoma